EBA Clearing is a provider of pan-European payment infrastructure wholly owned by shareholders that consist of major European banks.

It owns and operates major payment infrastructure in Europe for Euro payments between banks.  This includes EURO1 for high value payments system, STEP1, a payment system for single euro payments for small and medium-sized banks, and STEP2, a pan-European automated clearing house (PE-ACH).  It also operates the RT1 system for instant payments launched in November 2017. Both EURO1 and STEP2 have been identified as Systemically Important Payment Systems (SIPS) by the European Central Bank.

The organisation is based in Paris and has representative offices in Brussels, Frankfurt, Helsinki, London and Milan.

History
EBA Clearing was founded in June 1998 by the Euro Banking Association (EBA) and is owned by the major payment banks operating in Europe.

Its initial mission was to create and operate the clearing and settlement system for high-value euro transactions, EURO1, which the EBA had transferred to EBA Clearing at the launch of the Eurosystem in 1999. Besides EURO1, EBA Clearing also owns and operates STEP1, a payment system for single euro payments for small and medium-sized banks, and STEP2, a pan-European automated clearing house (PE-ACH) for Euro-denominated retail payments. In March 2013, EBA Clearing launched MyBank, an e-authorisation solution for online payments, which is geared at facilitating the growth of e-commerce across Europe.

In 2016, banks from nine countries agreed to create RT1, EBA Clearing's pan-European infrastructure for instant payments in Euro,  The system went live in November 2017.

Payment systems

EURO1 
EURO1 is a RTGS-equivalent large-value payment system that settles single Euro transactions of high priority and urgency, and primarily of large amount. EURO1 operates on a multilateral net basis, meaning that it continuously adjusts the accounts of the participant banks as they make payments for each other's customers. Payments are settled in real time with finality.   EURO1 The system is owned and operated by EBA Clearing. It is open to banks that have a registered address or branch in the European Union and fulfil a number of additional requirements. EURO1 is subject to German law (current account principle/single obligation structure) and is based on a messaging and IT infrastructure provided by SWIFT.

STEP1 
Since 2000, EBA Clearing has been offering a payment service named STEP1 for small and medium-sized banks for single euro payments of high priority and urgency. The technical infrastructure is the same as that of the EURO1 system, both use the messaging and IT infrastructure of SWIFT.

STEP2 
STEP2 was put into operation in 2003 with Italian payment system provider SIA S.p.A. It processes mass payments in euros. STEP2 is a pan-European automated clearing house (PE-ACH). This means that it complies with the principles set by the European Payments Council (EPC) for a PE-ACH Compliant Clearing and Settlement System.

From the beginning of Single Euro Payments Area (SEPA) on 28 January 2008, STEP2 has been offering SEPA Credit Transfer processing services across all SEPA countries.

Since 2 November 2009, the transposition date of the Payment Services Directive, EBA Clearing has been processing SEPA Direct Debits with its STEP2 SDD Core and STEP2 SEPA Direct Debit ("Business to Business") services.

Through its SEPA Credit Transfer and Direct Debit offerings, STEP2 provides banks across Europe with one channel through which they can send and receive their SEPA Credit Transfers and SEPA Direct Debits. The STEP2 platform reaches nearly 100 percent of all banks that have signed the SCT and SDD Scheme Adherence Agreements of the European Payments Council (EPC).

MyBank 
MyBank is a pan-European e-authorisation and Online Banking ePayments that was launched in March 2013 by EBA Clearing. The solution enables customers across Europe to pay for their online purchases via their regular online or mobile banking environment without having to disclose confidential data to the merchant or other third parties. The solution can be used for authorising SEPA Credit Transfers as well as the creation of SDD mandates. At a later stage, MyBank may also be used for transactions in currencies other than euro or for e-identity services.

Today, MyBank is owned and managed by PRETA S.A.S., a wholly owned subsidiary of EBA Clearing.

RT1 
RT1 is a pan-European instant payment system that provides the European payments industry with a pan-European infrastructure platform for real-time payments in euro under the SEPA Instant Credit Transfer scheme. Launched on 21 November 2017, the RT1 fast payment system allows commercial banks to offer fast payments through this system to their customers throughout the Eurozone.

References

External links
 

Banking in the European Union
Business and finance professional associations